Club Deportivo Amigó is a Spanish football club based in Aranguren, in the autonomous community of Navarre. Founded in 1986, the club play in the Regional Preferente – Group 1, holding home matches at the Campo de Futbol Colegio Luis Amigó.

History
Founded in 1986 as a multi-sport branch of the Colegio Luis Amigó, Amigó started their football section in 1998, and achieved promotion to the Regional Preferente (fifth tier) in 2004. Relegated in 2010, the club continued to play in the Primera Regional in the following years, and returned to the Preferente in 2016, when the division was already corresponding to the sixth tier.

In September 2022, Amigó qualified to the 2022–23 Copa del Rey after winning the Supercopa de Navarra over FC Bidezarra.

Season to season

References

External links
 
Soccerway team profile

Football clubs in Navarre
Association football clubs established in 1986
1986 establishments in Spain